The Beilstein is a hill in the Main-Kinzig district of Hesse, Germany. Its elevation is 499 metres above sea level.

Geography

Location
The Beilstein is located at the end of the valley of the Jossa. It is part of the Mittelgebirge Spessart and lies in the Hessian part of the range, close to the border to Bavaria. The Beilstein lies between Lettgenbrunn and Bad Orb, just south of the 521 m high . 

The Beilstein is part of the municipal territory of Jossgrund.

Geology

Unlike most of the Spessart, which consists mainly of Buntsandstein, the Beilstein is an outcropping of basalt. The upper slopes of the hill are wooded, but at the top basalt rocks are exposed. Around 10-20 million years ago, volcanic activity caused this to break through the local Buntsandstein, which is roughly 200 million years older. The Beilstein features characteristic basalt columns and the largest basalt cave in the Main-Kinzig district.

History
On the peak are the remains of a medieval hill castle known as Burg Beilstein. The place is first mentioned in 1059 as Bilstein as part of the border of the territory of Fulda monastery, but at that point it was likely not a castle but just a landmark. In 1313, the castle was bought by the Electorate of Mainz from the lords of Hohenlohe-Brauneck along with the area around Lettgenbrunn. The castle is last mentioned in 1427. Two important ancient trade routes, the Eselsweg and the Birkenhainer Strasse pass through the area. The former is overlooked by the Beilstein and was the likely reason for the castle's construction. Today, only the foundation of a wall remains of the castle.

After the war it was blown up and only the foundations remain.

Nature preserve

In 1905, the Beilstein was included on a list of German natural landmarks. In 1930, parts of the hill were declared a nature reserve, one of the first in Hesse.

References

External links

Hills of Hesse
Main-Kinzig-Kreis
Hills of the Spessart